Montigny-lès-Cormeilles (literally Montigny near Cormeilles) is a commune in Val d'Oise, in the northwestern suburbs of Paris, France.

History
On 30 March 1922, a part of the territory of Montigny-lès-Cormeilles was detached and merged with a part of the territory of Taverny and a part of the territory of Pierrelaye to create the commune of Beauchamp.

Population

Transport
Montigny-lès-Cormeilles is served by Montigny–Beauchamp station on Paris RER line C and on the Transilien Paris-Nord suburban rail line.

Montigny-lès-Cormeilles is also served by La Frette–Montigny station on the Transilien Paris-Saint-Lazare suburban rail line. This station, although administratively located on the territory of the neighboring commune of La Frette-sur-Seine, lies in fact very near the town center of Montigny-lès-Cormeilles.

See also
Cormeilles-en-Parisis
Communes of the Val-d'Oise department

References

External links
Official website 
Association of Mayors of the Val d'Oise 

Communes of Val-d'Oise